Gears is an album by jazz keyboardist  Johnny Hammond. It was released in 1975 and produced by Larry and Fonce Mizell.

Track listing
Tell Me What to Do	5:16	
Los Conquistadores Chocolates  5:56	
Lost on 23rd Street	6:36	
Fantasy  6:06	
Shifting Gears	5:19	
Can't We Smile	4:35

Personnel
Johnny "Hammond" Smith - Organ, Synthesizer, Electric Piano
Larry Mizell - Keyboards (Solina), Backing Vocals
Fonce Mizell - Clarinet, Backing Vocals
Jerry Peters - Electric Piano, Piano
Harvey Mason - Drums
Chuck Rainey - Electric Bass
Craig McMullen, John Rowin - Guitar
Roger Glenn - Flute, Vibraphone
Kenneth Nash - Cymbal, Gong, Percussion
 Hadley Caliman - Tenor Saxophone
Julian Priester - Trombone
Michael White - Violin

Charts

Samples
Several tracks have either sampled or taken inspiration from tracks on the album, most notably "Los Conquistadores Chocolates". A track titled "When You Gonna Learn" by UK group Jamiroquai, led by founding member Jay Kay, has chord progressions that bear a striking resemblance to the original chord progressions of a Smith's track "Los Conquistadores Chocolates". However, this was not by accident, as the booklet of the Acid Jazz Records release of the single bears a "special thanks" note to Smith, who gave permission to Jay Kay to use the composition's structure.

References

External links

1975 albums
Milestone Records albums
Albums produced by the Mizell Brothers
Jazz-funk albums
Johnny "Hammond" Smith albums